La hora del silencio is a Mexican telenovela produced by Miguel Ángel Herros for Televisa in 1978.

Cast 
Gloria Marín as Soledad
Curro Rivera as Curro Montes
David Reynoso as Gaspar
Helena Rojo as Barbara
Germán Robles as Miguel Romero
Alma Delfina as Maribel
Jaime Garza
René Casados

References

External links 

Mexican telenovelas
1978 telenovelas
Televisa telenovelas
Spanish-language telenovelas
1978 Mexican television series debuts
1978 Mexican television series endings